Myriopteris lindheimeri, formerly known as Cheilanthes lindheimeri, is a species of fern in the Pteridaceae family (subfamily Cheilanthoideae) with the common name fairy swords.

Description
Myriopteris lindheimeri grows in dense colonies from a long creeping rhizome with brown scales. Leaves are generally lanceolate and 7–30 cm long and 2–5 cm wide with a dark brown petiole. The leaf blade is 4-pinnate at the base, grayish or silvery green on top and covered with rusty brown wooly hairs below. The rachis has scattered linear-lanceolate scales and sparse hairs. Ultimate leaf segments are round to slightly oblong, beadlike, up to 0.7–1mm in diameter. The tops of the leaves typically have a distinctive silvery green tone.

Range and habitat
Myriopteris lindheimeri is native to southwestern United States and northern Mexico. It grows on rocky slopes and ledges, on a variety of acidic to mildly basic substrates, at elevations from 200 to 2500 m.

Taxonomy
Myriopteris lindheimeri is an apogamous (asexually reproducing) triploid of unknown parentage. Based on plastid DNA sequence, Myriopteris lindheimeri is part of Myriopteris clade C (covillei clade) and is very closely related to Myriopteris yavapensis. It is occasionally misidentified as Myriopteris  wootonii.

References

Works cited

lindheimeri